Lincoln City can refer to:

 Lincoln City F.C., an association football club based in Lincoln, England
 Lincoln City, Oregon, a city on the Oregon Coast in the United States
 Lincoln City, Indiana, a settlement in southwestern Indiana
 Lincoln, Delaware, also known as Lincoln City
 Lincoln, England also known as The City Of Lincoln
HMT Lincoln City, a British trawler that was bombed in the Faroe Islands in 1941

See also 
 Lincoln (disambiguation)